Göksel Kortay (born 6 April 1939) is a Turkish actress, voice actress, translator, and lecturer.

Biography 

Göksel Kortay was born in Istanbul on 6 April 1939. After graduating from Robert College, won the Fulbright scholarship and went to the US and continued her education there. Göksel Kortay finished Summer School. She graduated from Boston University's Department of Theater and Television with a degree in acting and directing. She also received a diploma in British Language and Literature from the University of Michigan. She has worked both as an actor and director in many professional and semi-professional theaters in Provincetown, New York, San Francisco and Massachusetts. She last job prior to where she lived for 6.5 years was the production supervisor of the programs "Say When" and "Tonight Show" which were broadcast on NBC, the famous television studio in New York.

After returning to Istanbul in 1962, she worked at Kenter Theater. She acted to Peachum. TRT Istanbul Radio has also received a mandate from experts. She directed both radio games and also made tourism and youth programs. She worked at various theaters, including Dormen Theater, Altan Erbulak-Metin Serezli Theater, Nisa Şerezli – Tolga Aşkıner Theater, Gönül Ülkü – Gazanfer Özcan Theater. She wrote, directed and voiced the bank's children's programs on the radio for 17 years.

In 1978, together with the "International Istanbul Players" theater group, they played Necati Cumali's "Nalinlar", an English work at Old Vic theater in London. They performed a world in the world, a community without native English, playing a game in England that was not written on the underside.
Kortay has been continuing his art life uninterrupted since 1964 and has been working as a lecturer at Mujdat Gezen Art Center for 10 years. She also taught at Doğuş University and Kadir Has University.
Göksel Kortay has turned over thirty Turkish to foreigners and all of them have been put on stage. Kortay, who has appeared in more than 20 Turkish films and many television series, played in 150 theater plays. For twelve years she was chairman of the Association of Theater Actors (TODER), who was chairman of the Jury of the Afife Jale Theater Awards for five years. Göksel Kortay met with Kerem Yılmazer in 1979 and lost her husband in a bombed terrorist attack in Istanbul in November 2003.

Filmography 
 Tadımız Kaçmasın – 2005 
 Altın Kafes – 2004 
 Ömerçip – 2003 
 Ruhsar – 1997 
 Ay Işığında Saklıdır – 1996 
 Yüzleşme – 1996 
 Gizli Aşk – 1995 
 Mirasyediler – 1995 
 Burnumu Keser misiniz? – 1992 
 Yıldızlar Gece Büyür – 1991 
 Gülüm Benim – 1987 
 Şalvar Bank – 1986 
 Bebek Davası – 1986 
 Gizli Duygular – 1984 
 Gençlik Köprüsü – 1975 
 Gelinlik Kızlar – 1972

Dubbing 
 Dallas – 1978–91 – Barbara Bel Geddes (Miss Ellie Ewing)
 The Little Mermaid – 1989 – Pat Carroll (Ursula)
 Atlantis: The Lost Empire – 2001 – Florence Stanley (Wilhelmina Bertha Packard)
 Monsters, Inc. – 2001 – Bob Peterson (Roz)

References

External links 
 
 Sinematürk 

1939 births
Living people
Turkish film actresses
Turkish stage actresses
Turkish voice actresses
University of Michigan alumni
Boston University College of Fine Arts alumni